United We Stand is a 2003 feature documentary directed by Matteo Barzini about America's reactions to 9/11 and the Iraq War. The documentary was presented in the New Territories section of the official selection at the 2003 Venice International Film Festival.

Plot
During, and immediately after the war in Iraq, a fim crew travelled six
thousand miles from Chicago to Los Angeles, via Dallas and Las Vegas,
(with a final brief visit to New York), gathering interviews on the road about
the war. The responses, often shocking, sometimes violent, appalled, heartfelt, but never banal, show the radical pro and anti-war polarization
of a country, and give an updated and unusual image of what America has 
become since 11 September 2001.

Awards and festivals
2003 Venice International Film Festival
2004 New York International Independent Film and Video Festival Honorable Mention
2004 Potenza International film festival

Critics
La Repubblica wrote: "From Chicago to Los Angeles, 6000 km of interviews on the war in Iraq give us an updated and unusual image of America today." Cinecittà News wrote: "What emerges from the film is the polarization between Iraq War supporters, who declare 'Kill as many as you can' and Americans outraged by the death of many civilians in the name of oil: 'We have enslaved Iraq'". Libero called United We Stand "A long journey in the deep heart of the United States."

References

External links 
 
 

2003 films
2003 documentary films
Italian documentary films
2000s English-language films
English-language Italian films
English-language documentary films